Piasek (meaning "sand" in Polish) is a large village in Silesian Voivodeship, southern Poland.

Piasek may also refer to:

Piasek, Częstochowa County in Silesian Voivodeship
Piasek, Lubliniec County in Silesian Voivodeship
Piasek, Subcarpathian Voivodeship (south-east Poland)
Piasek, Świętokrzyskie Voivodeship (south-central Poland)
Piasek, Warmian-Masurian Voivodeship (north Poland)
Piasek, West Pomeranian Voivodeship (north-west Poland)
Piasek, part of the Stare Miasto district of Kraków
Abram "Abe" Piasek (1928–2020), Polish-American Holocaust survivor
Andrzej Piaseczny, Polish singer, commonly called "Piasek"

Polish-language surnames